Premal Shah is an Indian-American entrepreneur who co-founded Kiva, a global poverty alleviation non-profit that has raised over $1 billion for low-income entrepreneurs in eighty countries.

Early life 
Shah was born in Ahmedabad, India, and raised in Minnesota, graduating from Irondale High School. He attended Stanford University, where he pursued his interest in economic development, with a specific focus on microfinance. At the London School of Economics he received a research grant to study the microfinance work of the Self-Employed Women's Association.

Career 
Shah was an early employee of and principal product manager at PayPal. Building on his college interest in microfinance, Shah took a sabbatical from PayPal in 2004 to prototype a concept of person-to-person microlending in India.

Upon his return to Silicon Valley in 2005, Shah joined Matt Flannery and Jessica Jackley in launching Kiva and scaling it into a global organization. Kiva has since raised over one billion dollars in loans from over a million lenders in support of over two million entrepreneurs from eighty countries. Seventy-five percent of loans are disbursed to women, with a repayment rate of ninety-six percent.

In addition to serving as president of Kiva, Shah sits on the boards of other non-profit of organizations, including Center for Humane Technology, Change.org Foundation, Watsi, and VolunteerMatch. He is considered to be a part of the PayPal Mafia, a group of PayPal alumni who have gone on to found or co-found other successful companies, including YouTube, LinkedIn, Tesla Motors, and Yelp.

Premal is currently listed as a Co-Founder at renewables.org - an investment platform for renewable energy in emerging markets.

Awards and honors 

 Fortune Magazine's 40 Under 40 List.
 Obama White House Champion of Change
 Visionary of the Year Nominee, San Francisco Chronicle
 World Economic Forum - Young Global Leader selection
 Olympic Torch carrier for the 2008 Summer Games
 Skoll Award for Social Entrepreneurship
 Goldman Sachs 100 Most Intriguing Entrepreneurs

Personal life 
Premal lives in San Francisco, California, with his wife and two children. He speaks widely about the potential for markets, technology & altruism to address some of society's toughest challenges.

References 

Living people
American people of Indian descent
American businesspeople
Stanford University alumni
Indian social entrepreneurs
Businesspeople from Ahmedabad
Year of birth missing (living people)